Aurelia Skipwith is an American attorney, businesswoman, and biologist who served as the director of the United States Fish and Wildlife Service from 2019 to 2021. She was confirmed by the Senate as director on December 12, 2019, by a 52–39 vote, and is the first black director of the Fish and Wildlife Service.

Early life and education 
Skipwith was born and raised in Indianapolis, Indiana, the oldest of nine children. Skipwith's family eventually relocated to Columbus, Mississippi. Skipwith's father served in the United States Navy and United States Army Reserve. Her grandfather was a farmer in Mississippi.

Skipwith received a Bachelor of Science degree in biology from Howard University in 2003, a Master of Science in molecular genetics from Purdue University, and a Juris Doctor from the University of Kentucky College of Law.

Career 
Skipwith began her career at Monsanto in 2006 as a lab technician, and worked her way to a sustainable agriculture partnership manager. Following her work at Monsanto, Skipwith completed law school and had a brief career as a research and legal intern at the United States Department of Agriculture. She also served as an intellectual property consultant for the United States Agency for International Development.

For a period of time, Skipwith worked at Alltech, an organization based in Nicholasville, Kentucky which specializes in animal nutrition and algae production. She later co-founded AVC Global, an agricultural supply blockchain company in early-2016.

From April 2017 to January 2020, Skipwith served as deputy assistant secretary fish, wildlife and parks of the Department of the Interior.

Skipwith served as the director of the United States Fish and Wildlife Service starting in January 2020. Her appointment was widely supported by conservatives and opposed by environmentalists due to her ties to the pesticide industry and her support of the Trump administration's efforts to roll back environmental protections. The Center for Biological Diversity stated “Aurelia Skipwith has been working in the Trump administration all along to end protections for billions of migratory birds, gut endangered species safeguards and eviscerate national monuments. Skipwith will always put the interests of her old boss Monsanto and other polluters ahead of America’s wildlife and help the most anti-environmental administration in history do even more damage.”

Under Skipwith's direction, the U.S. Fish and Wildlife Service generated controversy by not granting Monarch butterflies protection, requiring entries in the Federal Duck Stamp Contest to include a hunting theme, weakening rules against the killing of birds by oil and gas companies and others, and massively reducing the protected habitat of threatened owls.

She left office on January 19, 2021.

Personal life 
Skipwith was engaged to Leo Giacometto, a former member of the Montana Legislature and chief of staff to former Senator Conrad Burns. Giacometto was a co-founder of AVC Global and works as a lobbyist in the agriculture sector.

References

External links

Howard University alumni
Purdue University alumni
University of Kentucky College of Law alumni
United States Fish and Wildlife Service personnel
Trump administration personnel
Year of birth missing (living people)
American women biologists
African-American scientists
African-American women lawyers
African-American lawyers
Living people
People from Indianapolis
Indiana lawyers
21st-century American women